On 28 October 2018 at 10:02 AM, a bus plunged  off the Second Wanzhou Yangtze River Bridge into the Yangtze River in Wanzhou District, Chongqing, China. At least thirteen people died and two are missing.
Since 15 people were onboard at the time of the crash, it is believed that there were no survivors.

Crash
At approximately 10:02 AM, the bus, traveling at 51 km/h, turned into the opposite lane and smashed through the safety barriers on the side of the bridge before plunging into the river. Initial reports indicated that the bus had swerved to avoid an oncoming vehicle; however, footage recovered from the bus shows that a female passenger had attacked the driver, who retaliated. Local police have said the fight was the cause of the crash. Police said in a statement that the pair began arguing when the driver refused to let her off the bus after she missed her stop. The footage shows the pair gesturing at each other before the woman hits the driver in the face with her mobile phone.

Chinese authorities were able to eventually determine what happened based on the vehicle's black-box recording, witness accounts and other surveillance videos along the bus route.

Recovery
Divers recovered 13 bodies following a large rescue operation using a floating crane to recover the wreckage. Two people remain missing.

Zhao Hu, a lawyer, told Chinese state media that the families of the crash victims could seek damages from the relatives of the bus operator and the female passenger who started the fight. The police have said both the passenger and the driver broke laws by endangerment of public safety.  Zheng Chuankai, a lawyer with Anli Partners in Beijing, said the incident underscored the need to maintain strict laws to punish those who endanger public safety. “This case is very typical and very vicious,” he said.

See also
 2018 Lanzhou toll accident

References

October 2018 events in China
2018 disasters in China
2018 road incidents
Accidental deaths in China
Bus incidents in China
Driver distraction
History of Chongqing
Yangtze River